Jolien Sysmans (born 1 September 1992) is a Belgian swimmer. She was born in Geel. She competed in the women's 50m freestyle at the 2012 Summer Olympics in London, finishing with a time of 25.60 seconds in 31st place in the heats.

References

External links

1992 births
Living people
People from Geel
Olympic swimmers of Belgium
Swimmers at the 2012 Summer Olympics
Belgian female freestyle swimmers
Sportspeople from Antwerp Province